Abiell Whichello (sometimes given as Abel Wichelow or Wichello) (born 1 March 1683 - buried 16 August 1747, London) was an English composer and organist. He was the organist at St Edmund, King and Martyr from 1712 to 1747. He frequently attended Thomas Britton's concerts and was a founding member of the Royal Society of Musicians. His compositions included works for organ, harpsichord, and voice.

References

1683 births
1747 deaths
18th-century British composers
English classical composers
English male classical composers
English classical organists
British male organists
Members of the Royal Society of Musicians
Musicians from London
18th-century keyboardists
Male classical organists